Ro10-5824 is a drug which acts as a dopamine receptor partial agonist selective for the D4 subtype, and has nootropic effects in animal studies.

References

Dopamine agonists
Hoffmann-La Roche brands
Tetrahydropyridines
Pyrimidines